Northern Regional College (or NRC) is a third level educational institution in Northern Ireland, United Kingdom. The college has six campuses around the north-east of Northern Ireland (County Antrim and eastern County Londonderry): Ballymena (Trostan Avenue and Farm Lodge campuses), Ballymoney, Coleraine, Magherafelt and Newtownabbey. It also had a campus in Antrim and Larne but these have closed.

History 
The college was set up following a review of further education in Northern Ireland. NRC includes campuses from three predecessor institutions:
 Causeway Institute
 East Antrim Institute
 North East Institute.

References

External links
Northern Regional College official website

Further education colleges in Northern Ireland
Educational institutions established in 2007
Coleraine
2007 establishments in Northern Ireland
Newtownabbey